The Deer River is a river in Census division 23 in Northern Manitoba, Canada. It is in the Hudson Bay drainage basin and is a right tributary of the Dog River.

Course
It then turns north, and is roughly paralleled for the rest of its course by the Hudson Bay Railway; it passes closest to the railway points on the line (each with a flag stop railway station) of M'Clintock, Chesnaye and Lamprey. The river reaches its mouth at the Dog River, just upstream of that river's mouth at the Churchill River. The Churchill River flows to Hudson Bay.

Tributaries
Lost Moose Creek (right)
Clifford Smith Creek (left)
Robert Thomson Creek (left)

References

Rivers of Northern Manitoba
Hudson Bay drainage basin